The Colorful Strings of Jimmy Woode is the sole album led by American jazz bassist Jimmy Woode featuring tracks recorded in 1957 and released on the Argo label.

Reception

Allmusic awarded the album 4 stars stating "this rare opportunity to record as a leader, which first appeared as an Argo LP in 1958, is a welcome look into his abilities as a composer and arranger as well".

Track listing
All compositions by Jimmy Woode except as indicated
 "Falmouth Recollections" - 3:06 
 "The Way You Look Tonight" (Dorothy Fields, Jerome Kern) - 4:42
 "Foofy for President" - 6:39
 "The Man From Potter's Crossing" - 4:21
 "Dance of the Reluctant Drag" - 4:22
 "Empathy, For Ruth" - 3:24

Personnel 
Jimmy Woode - bass, vocals (2)
Mike Simpson - flute
Clark Terry - trumpet 
Britt Woodman - trombone
Porter Kilbert - alto saxophone 
Paul Gonsalves  - tenor saxophone
Ramsey Lewis - piano
Sam Woodyard - drums

References 

1958 albums
Jimmy Woode albums
Argo Records albums